Joseph W. Bessey (born June 25, 1961) is a former NASCAR owner/driver. He won one career Busch Series race before heading back to the Busch Grand National North Series in 2001, where he continues to field teams. In his driving career in that series in the mid-1990s, he won 21 races and two championships. Bessey is also a businessman, having started his own trucking companies in his 20s.

Racing career

Busch Series
Bessey made his Busch Series debut in 1988 at the Pennsylvania 300 at Nazareth Speedway in the No. 9 Pontiac. Despite an eighth place starting spot, he finished last after a crash on the opening lap. He made five other races in 1988, his best finish being 19th at Dover. He also finished his remaining five races.

Bessey made six more starts in 1989 and finished in the top-20 in four of the six races, with 14th at Dover, a 17th at Nazareth and had a pair of 20ths. He also had a top-10 start at Richmond. However, he did not finish his other two starts, but finished 45th in points. The next season, he only started four races, finishing just one of them.

Bessey made eight starts in 1991. Driving his No. 9 Pontiacs and the No. 64 Pontiacs, Bessey finished six of his eight starts, and managed his career best finish with a 14th place at Daytona International Speedway. He also had three top-10 starts, the best being at Nazareth.

Bessey made nine starts in 1992.  Bessey garnered an 11th-place run at Rockingham and then his first top-10 at Richmond. He also closed the year with three straight top-21 finishes. He was 42nd in the points, his highest showing to that date.

Bessey planned to run the full season in 1993. He made all but three races en route to a 17th-place points finish. Bessey had a best finish of third at Rockingham and added on a fourth at Rougement. He also had an eighth and a pair of 10ths. Bessey also earned his best career start of fourth at the inaugural race at Talladega.

With his success in 1993, Bessey focused more on the Busch North Series, but did manage to make 11 Busch Starts in 1994, three of which resulted in top-10s. Driving his No. 97 Bellsouth Chevy, Bessey finished sixth at Atlanta and 10th at Dover and Charlotte. He also had three top-10 starts.

Bessey returned for 1995. He had two top-10s: a ninth at Rockingham and a 10th at Nazareth.  (driving for Jimmy Spencer) However, Bessey continued to struggle in finishing races, only running at the end of half of his starts.

In 1996, he drove the No. 9 Delco Remy America Chevy in 12 races. For the first time since 1992, Bessey did not finish in the top-10 in any race, but did have five top-19 finishes. At Rockingham, Bessey made his debut for Power Team; a sponsorship deal resulted in a two-year deal to go Busch Racing full-time.

Bessey returned full-time 1997, driving the No. 6 Power Team Chevy. Bessey picked up his first win at the MBNA 200, despite being ill that day. He also had four other top-10 finishes, the best being a sixth at South Boston. He also earned his first career pole in the inaugural event at Gateway, and finished 18th in points, the best run of his career.

Bessey did not win a race in 1998, but had four top-10s, the best being a fifth at Nazareth. He had a solid weekend at New Hampshire, where he won the pole and led 107 laps. However, in a late race fight for the lead with Buckshot Jones, Bessey crashed while Jones won the race. Bessey had 14 top-10 finishes to finish 18th in standings.

With Bessey going full-time Cup racing in 1999, he only made a few starts that season. His best run was a 17th at Nazareth driving for Geoffrey Bodine and an 18th at Dover (back in his No. 6). He did not finish his other three starts.

Bessey and the No. 6 only returned for one race in 2000. He started 26th at New Hampshire, but crashed on the first lap and finished 43rd.

Bessey made three starts in 2001, with a 17th at Daytona, 43rd at Talladega and a 22nd at New Hampshire (where he started in the 8th position).

Bessey made his last two starts: a 25th at New Hampshire and an 18th at Nazareth. Afterward, Bessey moved back full-time to Busch North Series as an owner, where he continues to this day.

Winston Cup Series

Bessey moved his operation up to Winston Cup in 1999, fielding the No. 60 Power Team Chevy driven by Geoffrey Bodine. Bodine was eighth in the second race of the year at Rockingham. Bodine also earned a third-place finish late in the year at Martinsville Speedway. Also, Bodine was able to qualify in every race in 1999, earning the team a 27th-place finish.

Bodine, however, was injured in the season opening Craftsman Truck Series race of 2000, and Bessey was sent scrambling for a driver. The team missed the Daytona 500, but Bessey's new driver, Ted Musgrave made the next five races. After a best finish of 16th, Musgrave left and Bessey moved onto Dick Trickle, who made three starts for Bessey, before Bodine returned to the team at Richmond. Bodine had a solid run of 13th in his return, but the team continued to struggle to qualify. Bodine only made 10 of the next 14 races. Even with a best finish of 12th, Bessey released Bodine after a 41st at Richmond.

Bessey then made his Cup debut the next week at NHIS. He barely made it in with a 42nd place starting position at his home track. He finished 27th.

Bessey then used drivers Trickle and Rich Bickle to finish out the year. However, the team began to struggle to qualifying with Bessey's team only making a handful of the final eight races.

After a failed attempt to get Hermie Sadler to drive his car with The Rock sponsoring in 2001, Bessey closed down his Cup team, and ran selected Busch races after that.

Craftsman Truck Series
Bessey has also made four career starts in the Truck series. His best run came in his debut at Phoenix in 1995, where he started fifth and finished fourth in the No. 30 Taylor Togs Dodge. His other start in 1995 resulted in a 38th at Phoenix.

At NHIS in 1996, Bessey's lone run resulted in a fourth place start. Once again, he ran a solid race at his home track and drove the No. 9 Chevy to a sixth-place finish.

His sole race in 1997 came at Phoenix, driving for A. J. Foyt. There he started 19th, but struggled home to 35th place after his engine blew.

Motorsports career results

NASCAR
(key) (Bold – Pole position awarded by qualifying time. Italics – Pole position earned by points standings or practice time. * – Most laps led.)

Winston Cup Series

Busch Series

Craftsman Truck Series

ARCA Bondo/Mar-Hyde Series
(key) (Bold – Pole position awarded by qualifying time. Italics – Pole position earned by points standings or practice time. * – Most laps led.)

References

External links
 
 

1961 births
Living people
NASCAR drivers
NASCAR team owners
People from Scarborough, Maine
Racing drivers from Maine
ARCA Menards Series drivers
A. J. Foyt Enterprises drivers